James Hall Huling (March 24, 1844 – April 23, 1918) was an American Republican businessman and politician from West Virginia who served as a United States representative in the 54th United States Congress. Congressman Huling was born in Williamsport in Lycoming County, Pennsylvania, on March 24, 1844. He died April 23, 1918.

He went to school at Lycoming College in Williamsport. He served in the Pennsylvania Cavalry in 1863. He engaged in the lumber business and moved to West Virginia in 1870, he left the lumber business in 1874. He served as mayor of Charleston, West Virginia, from 1884 to 1888 but declined a renomination. He won election from West Virginia's 3rd District in 1894 as a Republican to the Fifty-fourth Congress (March 4, 1895 – March 3, 1897). He returned to business in Charleston, where he died April 23, 1918. Congressman Huling was buried there in Spring Hill Cemetery.

See also
 United States congressional delegations from West Virginia
 List of mayors of Charleston, West Virginia

Sources

  Online. September 11, 2007.

1844 births
1918 deaths
Burials at Spring Hill Cemetery (Charleston, West Virginia)
Businesspeople from Charleston, West Virginia
Lycoming College alumni
Mayors of Charleston, West Virginia
Politicians from Williamsport, Pennsylvania
People of Pennsylvania in the American Civil War
Republican Party members of the United States House of Representatives from West Virginia
19th-century American politicians
19th-century American businesspeople